American Players Theatre is a classical American theatrical troupe and theater complex located near Spring Green, Wisconsin. It has been called the best classical theater company in the United States by the late Wall Street Journal drama critic, Terry Teachout. The Theatre was founded by Randall Duk Kim, Anne Occhiogrosso, and Charles J. Bright, and held its first performance in 1980. Performances are held at a 110-acre complex with two theaters, a 1,089-seat outdoor amphitheater and the 200-seat indoor Touchstone Theatre. It is led by artistic director Brenda DeVita.

History
American Players Theatre was founded in 1977 by Randall Duk Kim, Anne Occhiogrosso, and Charles J. Bright. The group moved to Spring Green, Wisconsin in 1979 and held its first performance in 1980. The Theatre struggled financially in its early years and nearly closed after being nominated for a Regional Theatre Tony Award in 1985. By 1986, the Theatre had approximately $600,000 in debt and announced plans to close, but community fundraising and a loan from the state government allowed the Theatre to pay off its debts.

In 2009, the group built the 200-seat Touchstone Theatre to complement its outdoor amphitheater.

In 2017, the complex finished a $7.7 million renovation project, replacing a wooden stage built in 1995 in the outdoor amphitheater and adding additional space for props and sets.

Productions

Though initially founded as a purely Shakespearean company, the Theatre began adding other playwrights to its repertoire in 1985, beginning with Anton Chekhov. Since then, the Theatre has produced plays by George Bernard Shaw, Noël Coward, and Henrik Ibsen, among others. The Theatre produces nine plays each year, eight in the summer and one in winter. Artistic director Brenda DeVita said more than 110,000 people see the performances annually. The Theatre is known for the quality of its performances, with the late Wall Street Journal drama critic, Terry Teachout, calling it "the finest classical theater festival" in the United States.

References

External links

 American Players Theatre website

Theatres in Wisconsin
Shakespeare festivals in the United States
Tourist attractions in Iowa County, Wisconsin
Theatre companies in Wisconsin
Buildings and structures in Iowa County, Wisconsin